Octoraro may refer to:

Octoraro Creek, a tributary of the Susquehanna River in Pennsylvania
Octoraro Railway, a shortline railroad that operated in Pennsylvania between 1977 and 1994